Janet Lee (born October 22, 1976) is a Taiwanese-American retired tennis player. She won three doubles titles during her professional career on the WTA Tour. She competed in all four Grand Slam tournaments in both singles and doubles. Her career-high singles ranking is 79, and her best doubles ranking world No. 20.

Since retiring, she has been an assistant coach for the California State University, Fullerton(CSUF) women's tennis team. She was a full-time undergraduate student at the university, majoring in Business with an emphasis in Accounting and Finance. After earning her B.A. at CSUF, she joined the professional services firm Deloitte & Touche, LLP.

Personal
Her father is Shun-Yi Lee, a physicist, and her mother is Vanni Lee, a DP coordinator. Lee graduated from high school in 1994 and decided to postpone college to pursue a professional tennis career. She started playing tennis at age five.

Career
Lee competed in tennis competitions for Chinese Taipei at the 2000 Summer Olympics in Sydney women's doubles with partner Weng Tzu-ting. They lost in the first round.

Playing doubles at the 2004 US Open with Peng Shuai, Lee reached the quarterfinals where they lost to Barbara Schett and Patty Schnyder, 2–6, 5–7.

Lee retired from professional tennis in 2006.

WTA career finals

Doubles: 6 (3 titles, 3 runner-ups)

ITF Circuit finals

Singles (2–1)

Doubles (9–4)

References

External links
 
 
 

Olympic tennis players of Taiwan
Tennis players at the 2000 Summer Olympics
American sportspeople of Chinese descent
American sportspeople of Taiwanese descent
American sportswomen of Chinese descent
Taiwanese female tennis players
Tennis people from California
1976 births
Living people
Sportspeople from Lafayette, Indiana
Asian Games medalists in tennis
Tennis players at the 1998 Asian Games
Tennis players at the 2002 Asian Games
American female tennis players
Taiwanese-American tennis players
Universiade medalists in tennis
Medalists at the 1998 Asian Games
Medalists at the 2002 Asian Games
Asian Games gold medalists for Chinese Taipei
Asian Games bronze medalists for Chinese Taipei
Universiade gold medalists for Chinese Taipei
Universiade silver medalists for Chinese Taipei
Universiade bronze medalists for Chinese Taipei
Medalists at the 1999 Summer Universiade
Medalists at the 2001 Summer Universiade
21st-century American women